Peter Maurice Worsley (6 May 1924 – 15 March 2013) was a noted British sociologist and social anthropologist. He was a major figure in both anthropology and sociology, and is noted for introducing the term Third World into English.  He not only made theoretical and ethnographic contributions, but also was regarded as a key founding member of the New Left.

Early life and education 
Born in Birkenhead, Worsley started reading English at Emmanuel College, Cambridge but his studies were interrupted by World War II. He served in the British Army as an officer in Africa and India.  During this time he developed his interest in anthropology. After the war he worked on mass education in Tanganyika and then went to study under Max Gluckman at the University of Manchester. He received his PhD from the Australian National University in Canberra.

Career 
He lectured in sociology at the University of Hull and then went on to become the first Professor of Sociology at the University of Manchester in 1964.

Awards 
Winner of the Curl Bequest Prize (1955) of the Royal Anthropological Institute for The kinship system of the Tallensi: a revaluation (Published in JRAI 1956, pp. 37–75).

Key works 
.
.
.
.
.
.
 Subsequent publications by Weidenfeld & Nicolson (London), 1984 & 1988. .
 Subsequent publications 1998 & 1999. Alternative .
   Subsequent publications Routledge 1989, 1990 ; 2002 .

References 
 David Simon (ed) (2006) Fifty Key Thinkers in Development, Routledge

Citations

External links
 [https://www.sms.cam.ac.uk/media/1139306 Interviewed by Alan Macfarlane 25 February 1989 (video)

Academics of the University of Hull
Academics of the University of Manchester
Alumni of Emmanuel College, Cambridge
Alumni of the University of Manchester
British sociologists
Development specialists
British Army personnel of World War II
1924 births
2013 deaths
Presidents of the British Sociological Association
New Left